Gladys Emerson Cook (November 7, 1894-February 1977), was an American artist. She is known for her pictures of domestic pets and wild animals. Cook also wrote and illustrated books about animals including how to draw them.

Works

Art
Cook's artworks are held in the collections of the Marianna Kistler Beach Museum of Art ("Queenie" and Her Cubs), the Metropolitan Museum of Art (Siamese Interlude), the New York Public Library (Queenie and Her Cubs), Huntsville Museum of Art (Trellis Gateway), and the AKC Museum of the Dog (Ch. King Messenger, Pug Puppy, Pug Drawing, Tri-Int. Ch. Pugville’s Mighty Jim, and Wire Fox Terrier).

Books
Cook wrote and illustrated:
Drawing Wildlife (1972) 
All Breeds, All Champions: A Book Of Dogs (1962) 
Drawing Cats: Breeds; Structure; Anatomy; Poses and Behavior (1958) 
Drawing Dogs (1958) 
Circus Clowns On Parade (1956) 
The Big Book Of Cats (with contributing text by Felix Sutton) (1954) 
American Champions (1945) #
Zoo Animals (1943) . 

She illustrated:
Black Douglas (written by Adelaide Bolton Louden) (1957) 
Favorite Cat Stories Of Pamela And James Mason (written by Pamela And James Mason) (1956) 
Drawing Animals (written by Victor Semon Pérard) (1951) 
Cats: Care, Training, Feeding, Breeding, Exhibiting (written by Marguerite Ann Norton) (1949) 
Drawing horses (written by Victor Semon Pérard) (1944) 
Matou, The Biography Of A Cat (written by Max Kaufman) (1942) 
Hiram And Other Cats (written by Laurence Dwight Smith) (1941) .

Further reading
The Print Club of Albany Presents The Annual Print For 1956-1957: Queenie and Her Cubs - A Lithograph By Gladys Emerson Cook, SAGA, FRSA. (includes a short biography of Cook)
Gladys Emerson Cook – Cats, Dogs, & Erte? - article from the Journal Of Antiques & Collectibles
Paintings by American Women: Selections From The Collection Of Louise and Alan Sellars by Paul E. Sternberg

References

External links
WorldCat listing of Cook's books

1894 births
1977 deaths
20th-century American women artists
Artists from New York City
American women printmakers
American women illustrators
Artists from Massachusetts